Republic of Sierra Leone Armed Forces FC or simply RSLAF FC is a Sierra Leonean professional football club based in Makeni. They play in the Sierra Leone National Premier League, the top football league in Sierra Leone.

Honours
Sierra Leone National Premier League
Runners-up (1 time): 2013

Stadium
Republic of Sierra Leone Armed Forces FC play their home games at the 2000 capacity Wusum Sports Stadium.

References

External links
Team profile – The Biggest Football Archive of the World

Football clubs in Sierra Leone
Sport in Freetown
Military association football clubs